Crayton may refer to:

People
Crayton Hammer, videographer/producer
James Crayton, boxer
Jeremy Crayton, American football player
Louis Crayton, footballer
Patrick Crayton, American football player
Pee Wee Crayton, musician
Will Crayton, American Rapper

Places
Craytonia, Georgia, an unincorporated community, United States
Craytonville, South Carolina, an unincorporated community, United States